Tense may refer to:

Biology
 Tense, a state of muscle contraction

Linguistics
 Grammatical tense, a property of verbs  indicating chronology
 Tense–aspect–mood, a wider set of verb features (colloquially "tense")
 Tenseness, a constrained pronunciation, especially of vowels

Media
 Tense (album), a 2014 album by TVXQ
 Tense (artwork), a 1990 art installation by Anya Gallaccio

See also
Tension (disambiguation)